Lewistown is an unincorporated community in Caldwell County, Kentucky, United States.

References

Unincorporated communities in Caldwell County, Kentucky
Unincorporated communities in Kentucky